Prof Sergei Lvovich Sobolev FRSE (6 October 1908 – 3 January 1989) was a Soviet mathematician working in mathematical analysis and partial differential equations.

Sobolev introduced notions that are now fundamental for several areas of mathematics. Sobolev spaces can be defined by some growth conditions on the Fourier transform. They and their embedding theorems are an important subject in functional analysis. Generalized functions (later known as distributions) were first introduced by Sobolev in 1935 for weak solutions, and further developed by Laurent Schwartz. Sobolev abstracted the classical notion of differentiation, so expanding the range of application of the technique of Newton and Leibniz. The theory of distributions is considered now as the calculus of the modern epoch.

Life
He was born in St. Petersburg as the son of Lev Alexandrovich Sobolev, a lawyer, and his wife, Natalya Georgievna. His city was renamed Petrograd in his youth and then Leningrad in 1924.

Sobolev studied Mathematics at Leningrad University and graduated in 1929, having studied under Professor Nikolai Günther. After graduation, he worked with Vladimir Smirnov, whom he considered as his second teacher. He worked in Leningrad from 1932, and at the Steklov Mathematical Institute in Moscow from 1934. He headed the institute in evacuation to Kazan during World War II. He was a Moscow State University Professor of Mathematics from 1935 to 1957 and also a deputy director of the Institute for Atomic Energy from 1943 to 1957 where he participated in the A-bomb project of the USSR.
In 1958, he led with Nikolay Brusentsov the development of the ternary computer Setun.

In 1956, Sobolev joined a number of scientists in proposing a large-scale scientific and educational initiative for the Eastern parts of the Soviet Union, which resulted in the creation of the Siberian Division of the Academy of Sciences. He was the founder and first director of the Institute of Mathematics at Akademgorodok near Novosibirsk, which was later to bear his name, and played an important role in the establishment and development of Novosibirsk State University. In 1962, he called for a reform of the Soviet education system.

He died in Moscow.

Family

In 1930 he married Ariadna Dmitrievna.

Publications

In 1955 he co-wrote The Main Features of Cybernetics with Alexey Lyapunov and Anatoly Kitov which was published in Voprosy filosofii.

See also
Mollifier
Sobolev mapping

Notes

References
 (in French). In this paper Sergei Sobolev introduces generalized functions, applying them to the problem of solving linear hyperbolic partial differential equations.
 (in Russian, with French summary). In this paper Sergei Sobolev proved his embedding theorem, introducing and using integral operators very similar to mollifiers, without naming them.

Bibliography

Sergei Lvovich Sobolev (1908-1989). Bio-Bibliography (S.S. Kutateladze, editor) Novosibisrk, Sobolev Institute (2008),  
Sergei Lvovich Sobolev., in: Russian Mathematicians in the 20th Century (Yakov Sinai, editor), pp. 381–382. World Scientific Publishing, 2003. 
Jean Leray. La vie et l'œuvre de Serge Sobolev. [The life and works of Sergeĭ Sobolev]. Comptes Rendus de l'Académie des Sciences. Série Générale. La Vie des Sciences, vol. 7 (1990), no. 6, pp. 467–471.
G. V. Demidenko. A GREAT MATHEMATICIAN OF 20th CENTURY. On the occasion of the centenary from the birthdate of Sergei Lvovich Sobolev. Science in Siberia, no. 39 (2674), 2 October 2008
M. M. Lavrent'ev, Yu. G. Reshetnyak, A. A. Borovkov, S. K. Godunov, T. I. Zelenyak and S. S. Kutateladze. Remembrances of Sergei L'vovich Sobolev. Siberian Mathematical Journal, vol. 30 (1989), no. 3, pp. 502–504

External links

Sobolev Institute of Mathematics
Kutateladze S.S.,Sobolev and Schwartz: Two Fates and Two Fames
Kutateladze S.S.,Sobolev of the Euler school
:ru:Соболев, Сергей Львович
Sobolev's Biography in Russian

1908 births
1989 deaths
Mathematicians from Saint Petersburg
Soviet mathematicians
Russian inventors
Full Members of the USSR Academy of Sciences
Saint Petersburg State University alumni
Academic staff of Moscow State University
Academic staff of the Moscow Institute of Physics and Technology
Members of the French Academy of Sciences
Stalin Prize winners
Heroes of Socialist Labour
Members of the German Academy of Sciences at Berlin